Rene Mark Revillas Cuarto (born August 4, 1996) is a Filipino professional boxer who has held the IBF mini-flyweight title from 2021 to 2022.

Professional career

Early career
Cuarto made his professional debut on June 28, 2014, scoring a four-round unanimous decision (UD) victory against Rodante Suacasa at the Almendras Gym in Davao City, Philippines. After compiling a record of 15–1–1 (9 KOs), he defeated Clyde Azarcon via twelve-round UD at the Gaisano Mall of Davao, Philippines, to capture the vacant WBO Oriental mini-flyweight title.

IBF mini flyweight champion

The Taduran bouts
Following four more fights–two wins, one loss and a draw–he challenged IBF mini-flyweight champion Pedro Taduran on February 27, 2021 at the Bula Gym in General Santos, Philippines. The bout was initially expected to take place in January, but had to be postponed due to the ongoing COVID-19 pandemic. In a fight which saw Cuarto box at range while the defending champion took a more aggressive role, Cuarto defeated Taduran over twelve rounds via UD, capturing his first world title with all three judges scoring the bout 115–113.

Cuatro faced Taduran in an immediate rematch in his first IBF mini flyweight title defense. The bout was initially scheduled to take place at the City Gymnasium in Digos, Philippines on January 29, 2022, but was eventually postponed for February 6. Cuatro retained the title by a seventh-round technical decision. The bout was stopped due to a cut on Taduran's forehead, which was caused by an accidental clash of heads in the sixth round, after which Cuatro was awarded the majority decision. Two of the judges scored the fight 65–64 and 66–64 in his favor, while the third judge scored it as an even 65–65 draw. Cuatro knocked Tadruan down in both the second and sixth round and was deducted a point in the third round for an intentional headbutt.

Cuatro vs. Valladares
Cuatro was expected to make his second IBF mini flyweight title defense against the one-time IBF title challenger Daniel Valladares on May 27, 2022, in Monterrey, Mexico. It was supposed to be his second bout outside of the Philippines and first since September 29, 2017.  The bout was later cancelled however, due to undisclosed reasons. The fight was later rescheduled for July 1, 2022, and took place at the same location and venue. He lost the fight by split decision. Two judges scored the fight 116–111 and 115–112 in his favor, while the third judge scored the bout 114–113 for Cuatro. Cuatro was deducted a point in the tenth round, for loose glove tape.

Post title reign
Cuatro faced countryman Dexter Alimento on December 23, 2022, at the Baliok Gym in Davao City, Philippines. He won the fight by a second-round knockout. Alimento was unable to rise from the canvas in time to beat the ten count, after he was forced to take a knee with a liver shot. After he successfully bounced back from his third professional loss, Cuatro was ordered by the IBF to face Ginjiro Shigeoka for the interim mini-flyweight championship, as the reigning champion Daniel Valladares was sidelined with an injury. The fight is scheduled to take place on April 16, 2023, at the Yoyogi National Gymnasium in Tokyo, Japan.

Professional boxing record

See also
List of world mini-flyweight boxing champions

References

External links

 

1996 births
Living people
Sportspeople from Zamboanga del Norte
Filipino male boxers
International Boxing Federation champions
World mini-flyweight boxing champions
Mini-flyweight boxers